Gracie Otto is an Australian filmmaker and actor. She made her feature-length directing debut with the 2013 documentary The Last Impresario about prolific British theatre impresario and film producer Michael White. She has also directed a variety of screen content such as television commercial videos (TCVs), shorts, television series, feature films and documentaries.

Early life 
Gracie Otto is the daughter of the Australian actor Barry Otto and Susan Hill. Actress Miranda Otto is her half-sister. She attended Burwood Girls High School in Sydney. As a schoolgirl, Otto represented Australia and New South Wales in indoor soccer, and represented her home state New South Wales in school softball.

Director 
Otto's feature-length directing debut was with the 2014 documentary The Last Impresario, about prolific British theatre impresario and film producer Michael White. The film made its world premiere at the BFI London Film Festival in October 2013, where it was positively received by critics; it features interviews with 60 of his friends and associates.

Otto has directed over five short films, all of which have screened at international film festivals. In 2019, after winning the North American Script Competition through Soho House in the US, Gracie directed and edited a new short film, Desert, which premiered at the Toronto International Film Festival.

In 2019, Otto was the director of the second series of the Stan original, The Other Guy starring Matt Okine, Claudia Karvan, and Harriet Dyer. In early 2021, the Stan original series Bump was released starring Claudia Karvan, Natalie Morris, and Angus Sampson. Otto directed three of the ten episodes in the series.

In 2021, Otto's feature documentary Under the Volcano, about music producer George Martin's 1980s recording studio in Montserrat, was released. In 2022, she directed four episodes of the Netflix comedy drama series Heartbreak High, for which she was nominated for the AACTA Award for Best Direction in Drama or Comedy.

Filmography

Director 

Kill Blondes (2004)
Broken Beat (2005)
Tango Trois (2006)
La Meme Nuit (2007)
Seamstress (2011)
La Cabane a Marseille (2012)
Yearling (2012)
Parfum de Regrets (2012)
Fashion Lust (2013)
The Last Impresario (2013)
Candy Crush (with Thom Kerr) (2017)
Desert Dash (2018)
The Other Guy (Season 2) (2019)
Bump (2020)
Under the Volcano (2021)
Seriously Red (2022)
Heartbreak High (2022, 4 episodes)

Actress 

Eve (2005)
The New Life (2006)
Good Luck with That (2007)
Three Blind Mice (2008)
Sea Patrol (2009)
L.B.F. (2011)

References

External links 

1987 births
Living people
Australian film actresses
Actresses from Sydney